Central Baptist Church is a Baptist church located on the main Chandni Chowk Road, just opposite Gurdwara Sisganj and before the Fountain Chowk (Bhai Mati Das Chowk) in Delhi, India. It is probably the oldest Christian mission in the whole of the northern Indian region. In the late 18th century, the Baptist Missionary Society (BMS), London, purchased a piece of land near Red Fort where the Central Baptist Church was established in 1814.

History 
The Central Baptist Church, one of the oldest churches in Delhi, is a fine example of European architecture of that time. The southern side entrance of the church has a large deep colonnaded porch supported on thick heavy circular columns. Likewise the other two sides have double height verandahs with semi-circular arched openings. The church has been well maintained with its original motifs and carvings. However, the roof of the church has been re-laid with stones and iron beams. The walls of the church have memorial tablets remembering the faithful who devoted their whole life in service of the church.

It's also known as the "Mother Church", as it has raised several leaders, preachers, pastors and reverends who were/are leading several other churches and denominations in Delhi/NCR.Leaders like Late Rev. Walter David (President of Baptist Union of North India), Late Rev. Victor David, Late Rev. J.D Masih, Rev S.P David (Former President of Baptist Union of North India), Mr. Dayal Masih (Current President of Baptist Union of North India)and many more have been given to the world by this Church.

See also 
 St. Stephen's Church, Delhi
 Cathedral Church of the Redemption
 Sacred Heart Cathedral
 St. James' Church, Delhi

Baptist churches in India
Churches in Delhi
Religious organizations established in 1814
1814 establishments in British India